Tagadi is a village in Saku Parish, Harju County in northern Estonia.

References

 

Villages in Harju County